The Moonflowers were a Bristol-based rock band formed in 1987. The band was active as a performing and recording unit until 1997. To date they have released eight EPs and seven LPs on their own PopGod Records label, home to numerous other Bristol-based artists including Praise Space Electric (a Moonflowers spin-off featuring members of that band), Me, Ecstatic Orange, Mammal among others.

Famed for colourful and spectacular live shows, designed and built by Liam Yeates. They have toured extensively in the UK, Europe and Japan.

History
The band formed in 1987 and released their debut EP, We Dig Your Earth, in 1989. After a one-off single on Heavenly Records the following year "Get Higher"), singer The Reverend Sonik Ray (born Sean O'Neill) set up his own Pop God label for subsequent releases. The band received publicity after appearing in court for refusing to pay the poll tax, and appearing naked in the NME to promote their "Warshag" single. The band's debut album, Hash Smits, was released in December 1991, followed two years later by second album From Whales to Jupiter: Beyond the Stars of Rainbohemia. May 1995 saw the release of the Shake it Together EP and also an album that has been credited as having the longest title in history, We Would Fly Away (We Could Fly Away Never Look Back and Leave the World to Spin Silently in a Suicide Pact and all the Colours and Sounds That Pass Through Us in Space Fall Down to the Earth and Put a Smile on its Face).

The band relocated to France where they spent time busking, before returning to the studio for the Japan-only releases Brainwashing and Heartists Blue Life Stripes (1997) and Don't Just Sit There...Fly (2000) before splitting up.

Guitarist Jesse D Vernon had formed Morning Star in 1997, often featuring Jim Barr and John Parish, releasing four albums between 1997 and 2010. O'Neill formed a new band, Solar Mumuns, and released the album Breaking Waters in 2002.

Drummer Toby Pascoe died on 1 June 2001.

The Moonflowers reformed for a gig at the Cube Microplex on 11 November 2011.

Band members
The Reverend Sonik Ray (Sean O'Neill) - vocals, guitar
Smokin' Sam Burns - keyboards, saxophone, vocals
Jesse D Vernon - guitar
Yoddon  - drums (1987–1993)then percussion
Dougal MacShagger (Paul Waterworth) - bass guitar (1987–1995)
Elmo - DJ (1987–1990)
Praise The Electric Moonchillum (Toby Pascoe) - drums, percussion, vocals (1990–2000)
Gina Griffin - violin, vocals (1993–2000)

Discography

Albums
Hash Smits (1991), Pop God
From Whales to Jupiter Beyond the Stars of Rainbohemia (1993), Pop God
Colours and Sounds (We Could Fly Away Never Look Back and Leave the World to Spin Silently in a Suicide Pact and All the Colours and Sounds That Pass Through Us in Space Fall Down to the Earth and Put a Smile on Its Face) (1995), Pop God
Brainwashing and Heartists Blue Life Stripes (1997), Crue-I
Don't Just Sit There...Fly (2000), P-Vine

Compilations
Black Beetles and White Bird (1996), Crue-I
Dirty and Lost (EPs Collection) (2002), Colour and Sounds

Singles and EPs
We Dig Your Earth EP (1989), Electric Stars
"Get Higher" (1990), Heavenly
"Warshag" (1991), Pop God
"Fire" (1991), Pop God
Groovepower EP (1991), Pop God
Tighten Up on the Housework Brothers and Sisters EP (1992), Pop God
The Covers EP (1992), Pop God
Shake It Together EP (1995), Pop God

References

External links
 MySpace Profile
 Official Site
 Liam Yeates

English rock music groups
Musical groups from Bristol